Anabasis articulata is a plant of the genus Anabasis. It a salt-tolerant xerophyte that is found in the Syrian desert. Bedouins often use the plant's ashes as a soap substitute. 

The plant is also known for its medical properties. Algerian traditional medicine practitioners use the plants leaves to make anti-diabetic decoction.

References

Amaranthaceae
Flora of Syria
Barilla plants